A designer is a person who plans the form or structure of something before it is made, by preparing drawings or plans.

In practice, anyone who creates tangible or intangible objects, products, processes, laws, games, graphics, services, or experiences can be referred to as a designer.

Overview

Historically, the main area of design was regarded as only architecture, which was understood as the major art. The design of clothing, furniture, and other common artifacts were left mostly to tradition or artisans specializing in hand making them.

With the increasing complexity in industrial design of today's society, and due to the needs of mass production where more time is usually associated with more cost, the production methods became more complex and with them, the way designs and their production are created. The classical areas are now subdivided into smaller and more specialized domains of design (landscape design, urban design, interior design, industrial design, furniture design, fashion design, and much more) according to the product designed or perhaps its means of production. Despite the variety of specializations within the design industry, all of them have similarities in terms of the approach, skills, and methods of working.

Using design methods and design thinking to resolve problems and create new solutions are the most important aspects of being a designer. Part of a designer's job is to get to know the audience they intend on serving.

In education, the methods of teaching or the program and theories followed vary according to schools and field of study. In industry, a design team for large projects is usually composed of a number of different types of designers and specialists. The relationships between team members will vary according to the proposed product, the processes of production or the research followed during the idea development, but normally they give an opportunity to everyone in the team to take a part in the creation process.

Design professions
Different types of designers include:
Animation
Architecture
Communication design
Costume design
Engineering design
Fashion design
Floral design
Furniture design
Game design
Graphic design
Industrial design
Interaction design
Interior design
Jewellery design
Landscape design
Instructional design
Logo design
Lighting design
Packaging design
Product design
Scenic design
Service design
Software design
Sound design
Strategic design
Systems design
Textile design
Urban design
User experience design
User interface design
Web design

See also
Architect
Design
Design engineer
Design firm
Design thinking
Visual arts

Footnotes

Design
Visual arts occupations
Design occupations